This list of the Cenozoic life of Nevada contains the various prehistoric life-forms whose fossilized remains have been reported from within the US state of Nevada and are between 66 million and 10,000 years of age.

A

  Abies
 †Abies concoloroides
 †Abies klamathensis
 †Abies laticarpus
 †Abies nevadensis
 †Abies scherri
 †Abies scherrii
 Acer
 †Acer chaneyii
 †Acer cyaneyii
 †Acer glabroides
 †Acer medianum
 †Acer middlegatensis
 †Acer negundoides
 †Acer nevadensis
 †Acer oregonianum
 †Acer scottiae
 †Acer septilobatum
 †Acer trainii
 †Acer tyrrelli
 †Acer tyrrellii
 †Actiocyon
 †Actiocyon parverratis – type locality for species
  †Aelurodon
 †Aelurodon asthenostylus
 †Aelurodon taxoides
  †Aepycamelus
 †Aepycamelus bradyi – type locality for species
 †Aepycamelus robustus – or unidentified comparable form
 †Aepycamelus stocki
 †Aesculus
 †Aesculus ashleyi – type locality for species
 †Aesculus preglabra
  †Agriotherium
 †Agulla
 †Agulla mineralensis – type locality for species
  †Aletomeryx
 †Alforjas
 †Alilepus
 †Alilepus hibbardi
 †Alilepus vagus
 †Allophaiomys
 †Allophaiomys pliocaenicus
 †Alluvisorex
 †Alluvisorex chasseae
  Alnus
 †Alnus harneyana
 †Alnus largei
 †Alnus latahensis
 †Alnus pyramidensis
 †Alnus smithiana – type locality for species
 †Alnus spokanensis
 †Alphagaulus
 †Alphagaulus pristinus – or unidentified comparable form
 †Alphagaulus vetus
  Amelanchier
 †Amelanchier alvordensis
 †Amelanchier apiculata
 †Amelanchier desatoyana
 †Amelanchier grayi
 †Amelanchier nevadensis – type locality for species
 †Americaphis – type locality for genus
 †Americaphis longipes – type locality for species
 †Amorpha
 †Amorpha oblongifolia
 †Amorpha stenophylla
  †Anchitheriomys
 †Ansomys
 †Ansomys nevadensis – type locality for species
 †Antecalomys
 †Antecalomys valensis
 †Antecalomys vasquezi – or unidentified comparable form
 †Antiacodon
 †Antiacodon pygmaeus
 Antrozous
 †Antrozous pallidus
 †Apatemys
 †Apatemys bellus
  †Aphelops
 †Aphelops malacorhinus
 †Aphelops megalodus
 †Apis
 †Apis nearctica – type locality for species
 Arbutus
 †Arbutus idahoensis
 †Arbutus matthesii
 †Arbutus menziesii
 †Arbutus prexalapensis
  †Arctodus
 †Arctodus simus
 †Arctostaphylos
 †Arctostaphylos verdiana
 †Astrohippus

B

  †Barbourofelis
 †Barbourofelis fricki
 †Bassaricyonoides – type locality for genus
 †Bassaricyonoides stewartae – type locality for species
 Bassariscus
 †Bassariscus antiquus
 †Bensonomys
 †Bensonomys arizonae – or unidentified comparable form
 †Bensonomys coffeyi – or unidentified comparable form
 †Bensonomys lindsayi – type locality for species
 Betula
 †Betula ashleyi
 †Betula ashleyii
 †Betula desatoyana
 †Betula idahoensis
 †Betula smithiana
 †Betula thor
 †Betula vera
  †Borophagus
 †Borophagus diversidens – or unidentified comparable form
 †Bouromeryx
 †Bouromeryx americanus
 †Bouromeryx submilleri
  †Brachycrus
 †Brachyerix
 †Brachyerix incertis
 Brachylagus
 †Brachylagus idahoensis
 †Brachypsalis
 †Brachypsalis pachycephalus
 †Brevimalictis – type locality for genus
 †Brevimalictis chikasha – type locality for species
 †Bumelia
 †Bumelia beaverana

C

 †Calocedrus
 †Calocedrus masonii
  †Camelops – tentative report
 Candona
 Canis
 †Canis latrans
 †Canis lepophagus
 †Capricamelus
 †Carpocyon
 †Carpocyon compressus
 Carya
 †Carya bendirei
 †Carya ovata
  Castanopsis
 †Castanopsis sonomensis
 Ceanothus
 †Ceanothus chaneyi
 †Ceanothus leitchii
 †Ceanothus precuneatus
 Cedrela
 †Cedrela trainii
  †Ceratophyllum
 †Ceratophyllum praedemersum
 Cercis
 †Cercis carsoniana – type locality for species
 †Cercocarpus
 †Cercocarpus antiquus
 †Cercocarpus eastgatensis
 †Cercocarpus linearifolius
 †Cercocarpus nevadensis – type locality for species
 †Cercocarpus ovatifolius
  †Chamaebatia
 †Chamaebatia nevadensis
 †Chamaecyparis
 †Chamaecyparis cordillerae
 †Chamaecyparis linguaefolia
 Chara
 †Chara verdiana
 †Chrysolepis
 †Chrysolepis convexa
 †Chrysolepis sonomensis
 Cnemidophorus
  †Cnemidophorus tigris
 Comptonia
 †Comptonia parvifolia – type locality for species
 †Copemys
 †Copemys esmeraldensis – type locality for species
 †Copemys loxodon
 Cornus
 †Cornus ovalis
  †Cosoryx
 †Cosoryx furcatus
 Crataegus
 †Crataegus gracilens
 †Crataegus middlegatensis
 †Crataegus newberryi
 †Crataegus pacifica
 Crotalus
 †Crotalus atrox
 †Crotalus mitchelli
 †Crotalus viridis
 Crotaphytus
 †Crotaphytus collaris
 †Cupidinimus
 †Cupidinimus cuyamensis
 †Cupidinimus magnus
 †Cupidinimus tertius
  †Cuvieronius – tentative report

D

 †Desmathyus
 †Desmathyus pinensis
 †Desmatippus
 †Desmatippus avus – or unidentified comparable form
  †Diceratherium – or unidentified comparable form
  †Dinohippus
 †Diospyros
 †Diospyros oregonianum
 Dipodomys
 †Dipodomys gidleyi
 †Dipoides
 †Dipoides stirtoni – or unidentified comparable form
 †Dipoides wilsoni – or unidentified comparable form
 †Diprionomys
 †Diprionomys minimus – type locality for species
 †Diprionomys parvus – type locality for species
 †Domninoides
 †Domninoides riparensis – or unidentified comparable form
 †Dromomeryx
 †Dromomeryx borealis

E

 †Elkobatrachus – type locality for genus
 †Elkobatrachus brocki – type locality for species
 †Elymys
 †Elymys complexus
 †Eorubeta – type locality for genus
 †Eorubeta nevadensis – type locality for species
  †Epicyon
 †Epicyon saevus
 †Equisetum
 †Equisetum alexanderi
 Equus
 †Equus giganteus
 †Equus idahoensis
  †Equus simplicidens
 †Eriosaphis – type locality for genus
 †Eriosaphis leei – type locality for species
 †Eriosomaphis – type locality for genus
 †Eriosomaphis jesperi – type locality for species
 †Eriosomaphis occidentalis – type locality for species
 †Eucastor
  †Euceratherium
 †Euceratherium collinum
  †Eucyon
 †Eucyon davisi
 Eugenia
 †Eugenia nevadensis

F

 †Fouchia
 †Fouchia elyensis
  †Fraxinus
 †Fraxinus alcorni – type locality for species
 †Fraxinus caudata
 †Fraxinus coulteri
 †Fraxinus desatoyana
 †Fraxinus eastgatensis
 †Fraxinus millsiana

G

 Gambelia
 †Garrya
 †Garrya idahoensis
 †Gigantocamelus
 †Gigantocamelus spatulus
  Glyptostrobus
 †Glyptostrobus oregonensis
  †Gomphotherium
 †Gomphotherium obscurum
 Gopherus
 †Gopherus agassizii
 †Gymnocladus
 †Gymnocladus dayana

H

 †Helaletes
 †Helaletes nanus
 Heloderma
  †Heloderma suspectum
 †Hemiauchenia
 †Hemiauchenia macrocephala – or unidentified comparable form
 †Hesperhys
 †Hesperhys vagrans – or unidentified related form
 †Hesperocamelus
 †Hesperocamelus stylodon – type locality for species
 †Hesperogaulus
 †Hesperolagomys
 †Hesperolagomys galbreathi – type locality for species
 †Heteromeles
 †Heteromeles desatoyana
 †Heteromeles sonomensis
 †Heteromeles stenophylla – type locality for species
 †Hexobelomeryx
  †Hipparion
 †Hipparion tehonense
 †Hippotherium
 †Holodiscus
 †Holodiscus idahoensis
 Hydrangea
 †Hydrangea bendirei
 †Hydrangea ovatifolius
  †Hyopsodus
 †Hyopsodus paulus
  †Hypohippus
 †Hypohippus affinis
 †Hypohippus nevadensis – type locality for species
 †Hypohippus osborni – or unidentified comparable form
 †Hypolagus
 †Hypolagus edensis
 †Hypolagus fontinalis
 †Hypolagus furlongi
 †Hypolagus gidleyi
 †Hypolagus parviplicatus – type locality for species
 †Hypolagus ringoldensis
 †Hypolagus tedfordi
 †Hypolagus vetus – type locality for species
  †Hyrachyus
 †Hyrachyus modestus
 †Hystricops – tentative report

I

 †Ilingoceros
 †Ilingoceros alexandrae – type locality for species
 †Ilingoceros schizoceras – type locality for species
  †Indarctos
 †Indarctos nevadensis
 †Ischyrocyon
 †Isectolophus
 †Isectolophus latidens

J

 Juglans
 †Juglans desatoyana
 †Juglans nevadensis
  Juniperus
 †Juniperus desatoyana
 †Juniperus nevadensis

K

 †Knightomys

L

 †Lachnarius – type locality for genus
 †Lachnarius miocaenicus – type locality for species
  Lampropeltis
 †Lampropeltis getulus
  Larix
 †Larix cassiana
 †Larix churchillensis
 †Larix fernleyii – type locality for species
 †Larix nevadensis
 Lemmiscus
 †Lemmiscus curtatus
 †Lepoides
 †Lepoides lepoides
  †Leptocyon
 †Leptocyon leidyi
 †Leptocyon matthewi
 †Leptocyon vafer
 †Leucothoe
 †Leucothoe nevadensis
 †Limnoecus
 †Limnoecus compressus
 †Limnoecus tricuspis
 Limnonyx
 †Liodontia
 †Liodontia alexandrae – type locality for species
 †Liodontia furlongi
 †Lithocarpus
 †Lithocarpus nevadensis
 †Lutravus
 †Lutravus halli – type locality for species
  Lymnaea
 †Lyonothamnus
 †Lyonothamnus cedrusensis
 †Lyonothamnus parvifolius

M

  †Machairodus
 †Macrognathomys
 †Macrognathomys nanus – type locality for species
 Mahonia
 †Mahonia macginitiei
 †Mahonia marginata
 †Mahonia reticulata
 †Mahonia reticulate
 †Mahonia simplex
 †Mahonia trainii
 †Mammut
 †Mammut americanum
 †Mammut matthewi
 Marmota
 †Marmota korthi – type locality for species
 †Marmota minor
 †Marshochoerus
 †Marshochoerus socialis
 †Martinogale – tentative report
 Masticophis
 †Masticophis flagellum
  †Mastodon
 †Mastodon proavus
 †Mattimys
  †Megahippus
 †Megahippus matthewi – or unidentified comparable form
 †Megahippus mckennai
 †Megalonyx
  †Megalonyx leptostomus
 †Megapeomys
 †Megapeomys bobwilsoni – type locality for species
  †Megatylopus
 †Meniscomys
 †Meniscomys hippodus
 †Merychippus
 †Merychippus brevidontus
 †Merychippus calamarius
 †Merychippus californicus
 †Merychippus close
  †Merychyus
 †Merychyus elegans
 †Merychyus novomexicanus
  †Merycodus
 †Merycodus hookwayi – type locality for species
 †Metalopex
 †Metalopex merriami
 †Metatomarctus
 †Metechinus
 †Metechinus nevadensis – type locality for species
 †Microparamys
 †Microparamys sambucus
 †Microtomarctus
 †Microtomarctus conferta
 Microtus
 †Microtus meadensis
 †Microtus paroperarius
 †Microtus pennsylvanicus
 Mictomys
 †Mictomys meltoni
 †Mimomys
 †Mimomys panacaensis – type locality for species
 †Mimomys virginianus
 †Mioedipoda – type locality for genus
 †Mioedipoda reisereri – type locality for species
 †Miopelodytes – type locality for genus
 †Miopelodytes gilmorei – type locality for species
 †Miospermophilus
 †Miospermophilus wyomingensis
 †Monosaulax
 †Monosaulax curtus
 †Monosaulax skinneri
  †Moropus
 †Moropus merriami
 Mustela
 †Mustela americana
  †Mustela nigripes
 †Mustela nivalis
 Myotis
 †Mystipterus
 †Mystipterus vespertilio – type locality for species

N

 †Negodiaetictis – type locality for genus
 †Negodiaetictis rugatrulleum – type locality for species
 †Nekrolagus
 †Nekrolagus progressus
  †Neohipparion
 †Neohipparion leptode – type locality for species
 Neotoma
 †Neotoma vaughani – or unidentified comparable form
 †Neotragocerus – tentative report
 †Nerterogeomys – tentative report
 †Nevaphis – type locality for genus
 †Nevaphis nevadensis – type locality for species
 †Notharctus
  †Notharctus tenebrosus
 Notiosorex
 †Nymphaeites
 †Nymphaeites nevadensis

O

 Odocoileus
 Ondatra
 †Ondatra idahoensis – tentative report
 †Ophiomys
 †Ophiomys magilli
 Oreamnos
  †Oreamnos americanus
 †Oregonomys
 †Oregonomys sargenti – or unidentified comparable form
 †Oreolagus
 †Oreolagus nevadensis – type locality for species
 Ostrya
 †Ostrya oregoniana
 Ovis
  †Ovis canadensis

P

 †Pachystima
 †Pachystima nevadensis
 †Paciculus – or unidentified comparable form
 †Paenemarmota
 †Paenemarmota nevadensis
 †Palaeogreenidea – type locality for genus
 †Palaeogreenidea rittae – type locality for species
 †Pantolestes
 †Pantolestes longieundus
  †Paracamelus
 †Paracosoryx
 †Paracosoryx alticornis – or unidentified comparable form
 †Paracosoryx loxoceros
 †Paracosoryx nevadensis
 †Paracosoryx wilsoni – or unidentified related form
 †Paracynarctus
 †Paracynarctus kelloggi
  †Parahippus
 †Parahippus pawniensis
 †Parapliohippus
 †Parapliohippus carrizoensis – or unidentified comparable form
 †Parapliosaccomys
 †Parapliosaccomys oregonensis
 †Paratomarctus
 †Paratomarctus temerarius
 †Paronychomys
 †Paronychomys lemredfieldi – or unidentified comparable form
 †Pauromys
 †Pauromys exallos
 †Peraceras
 †Peraceras profectum
 †Peraceras superciliosum
 †Perognathoides
 †Perognathoides quartus
  Perognathus
 †Perognathus minutus – or unidentified comparable form
  Peromyscus
 †Peromyscus antiquus – type locality for species
 †Peromyscus dentalis
 †Pewelagus
 †Pewelagus dawsonae
 Phenacomys
 †Phenacomys gryci – or unidentified comparable form
 Phrynosoma
 †Phrynosoma platyrhinos
 Picea
 †Picea lahontense
 †Picea magna
 †Picea sonomensis
  Pinus
 †Pinus alvordensis
 †Pinus balfouroides
 †Pinus florissanti
 †Pinus ponderosoides
 †Pinus prelambertiana
 †Pinus quinifolia
 †Pinus sturgisii
 †Pinus tiptoniana
 †Pinus wheeleri
 Pituophis
 †Pituophis catenifer
 Platanus
 †Platanus bendirei
 †Platanus dissecta
 †Platanus paucidentata
  †Platygonus
 †Platygonus pearcei – or unidentified comparable form
 †Pleiolama
 †Pleiolama vera
 †Plesiosorex
 †Plesiosorex latidens
 †Pliauchenia
 †Pliogale
 †Pliogale furlongi – type locality for species
  †Pliohippus
 †Pliohippus fairbanksi – or unidentified comparable form
 †Pliohippus spectans
 †Pliosaccomys
 †Pliosaccomys dubius – type locality for species
 †Pliotaxidea
 †Pliotaxidea nevadensis
 †Pliozapus
 †Pliozapus solus – type locality for species
 †Pontoniella – tentative report
 †Populas
 †Populas eotremuloides
  Populus
 †Populus alexanderi
 †Populus bonhamii
 †Populus cedrusensis
 †Populus eotremuloidea
 †Populus eotremuloides
 †Populus payettensis
 †Populus pliotremuloides
 †Populus sonorensis
 †Populus subwashoensis – type locality for species
 †Populus washoensis
 †Problastomeryx
 †Problastomeryx primus
  †Procamelus
 †Procamelus grandis – or unidentified comparable form
 †Prodipodomys
 †Prodipoides
 †Prodipoides dividerus – type locality for species
 †Prodipoides lecontei
 †Pronotolagus
 †Pronotolagus nevadensis – type locality for species
 †Prosthennops
 †Prosthennops niobrarensis – or unidentified comparable form
 †Protolabis
 †Protolabis coartatus
 †Protolabis heterodontus
 †Protomarctus
 †Protomarctus optatus
 †Protomelanitta
 †Protomelanitta bakeri – type locality for species
 †Protospermophilus
 †Protospermophilus angusticeps
  Prunus
 †Prunus chaneyi
 †Prunus chaneyii
 †Prunus moragensis
 †Prunus treasheri
  †Pseudaelurus
 †Pseudaelurus intrepidus
 †Pseudocamponotus – type locality for genus
 †Pseudocamponotus elkoanus – type locality for species
 †Pseudotrimylus
  †Pseudotsuga
 †Pseudotsuga sonomensis
 Pteridium
 †Pteridium scalabazensis
 Pterocarya
 †Pterocarya mixta

Q

  Quercus
 †Quercus hannibali
 †Quercus hannibalii
 †Quercus pollardiana
 †Quercus prelobata
 †Quercus renoana
 †Quercus shrevoides
 †Quercus simulata
 †Quercus wislizenoides

R

 †Rana
 †Rana johnsoni – type locality for species
  †Rana pipiens
 †Reithroparamys
 †Reithroparamys delicatissimus
 †Reithroparamys huerfanensis – or unidentified comparable form
 †Repomys
 †Repomys gustelyi – or unidentified comparable form
 †Repomys panacaensis
 †Rhamnus
 †Rhamnus columbiana
 †Rhamnus precalifornica
  Rhododendron
 †Rhododendron gianellana
  †Rhynchotherium
 Rhyncolus
 †Rhyncolus kathrynae – type locality for species
 †Ribes
 †Ribes barrowsii
 †Ribes bonhamii
 †Ribes galeana
 †Ribes stanfordianum
 †Ribes webbi
 †Robinia
 †Robinia bisonensis
 †Robinia californica
 Rosa
 †Rosa harneyana
 †Rosa schornii

S

  Salix
 †Salix boisiensis
 †Salix churchillensis
 †Salix desatoyana
 †Salix inquirenda
 †Salix knowltoni
 †Salix laevigatoides
 †Salix owyheeana
 †Salix payettensis
 †Salix pelviga
 †Salix storeyana
 †Salix truckeana
 †Salix venosiuscula
 †Salix wildcatensis
  †Satherium
 †Satherium piscinarium
 Sauromalus
  †Sauromalus obesus
 Scapanus
 †Sciuravus
 Sciurus
 †Sciurus olsoni – type locality for species
 †Sequoiadendron
 †Sequoiadendron chaneyi – type locality for species
 †Sequoiadendron chaneyii
 †Similidrepan – type locality for genus
 †Similidrepan pulawskii – type locality for species
 †Sinocapra
 †Sinocapra willdownsi – type locality for species
  †Sinopa
 †Sinopa rapax
 †Sophora
 †Sophora spokanensis
 †Sorbus
 †Sorbus cassiana
 †Sorbus idahoensis
 †Sorbus macjannetii
 Sorex
 †Sparganium
 †Sparganium nevadense
 Spea
 †Spea alexanderi – type locality for species
 Spermophilus
 †Spermophilus argonautus
 †Spermophilus howelli
 †Spermophilus wellingtonensis
 Sphaerium
 †Sphenophalos
 †Sphenophalos nevadanus – type locality for species
  †Steneofiber
 †Steneofiber gradatus
 †Styrax
 †Styrax middlegatensis
  †Subdromomeryx
 †Subdromomeryx antilopinus – or unidentified related form
 †Symphoricarpos
 †Symphoricarpos wassukana – type locality for species

T

 Tamias
 †Tamias ateles
 †Tardontia
 †Tardontia nevadans – type locality for species
 †Tardontia occidentale
  Taxidea
 Taxodium
 †Taxodium oregonensis
  †Teleoceras
 †Teleoceras fossiger
 †Teleoceras hicksi
 †Teleoceras major
 †Teleoceras medicornutum
 †Tetrapassalus – tentative report
 †Tetrapassalus mckennai – or unidentified comparable form
 †Texoceros
 Thomomys
 †Thomomys carsonensis – type locality for species
 †Thuja
 †Thuja dimorpha
  †Ticholeptus
 †Ticholeptus zygomaticus
 Tipula
 †Tipula nevadensis – type locality for species
  †Tomarctus
 †Tomarctus brevirostris
 †Torreya
 †Torreya nancyana – type locality for species
 †Trogolemur
 †Trogolemur myodes
 †Tsuga
 †Tsuga mertensioides
 †Tsuga sonomensis
 Typha
 †Typha lesquereuxi
 †Typha lesquereuxii

U

 †Uintasorex
 Ulmus
 †Ulmus moorei
 †Ulmus speciosa
 †Ursavus
 †Ursavus brevirhinus – or unidentified comparable form
 †Ursavus pawniensis
 †Ursavus primaevus – or unidentified comparable form
 Ursus
 †Ursus abstrusus
 †Ursus americanus
  †Ursus arctos – or unidentified comparable form

V

  †Vaccinium
 †Vaccinium sophoroides
 †Viverravus
 †Viverravus minutus
 Vulpes
 †Vulpes stenognathus

Z

 Zelkova
 †Zelkova brownii
 †Zelkova nevadensis – type locality for species
  †Zygolophodon

References
 

Cenozoic
Nevada